The ashy-headed tyrannulet (Phyllomyias cinereiceps) is a species of bird in the family Tyrannidae. It is found in Colombia, Ecuador, and Peru.

Its natural habitat is subtropical or tropical moist montane forests.

References

ashy-headed tyrannulet
Birds of the Northern Andes
ashy-headed tyrannulet
ashy-headed tyrannulet]
Taxonomy articles created by Polbot